Locke Township is one of sixteen townships in Elkhart County, Indiana. As of the 2010 census, its population was 3,913.

History
Locke Township was organized in the 1840s. It was named for Samuel Lockwood, a pioneer settler and native of Vermont.

Geography

Cities and towns
 Nappanee (northwest quarter)

Unincorporated towns
 Locke

Adjacent townships
 Olive Township (north)
 Harrison Township (northeast)
 Union Township (east)
 Jefferson Township, Kosciusko County (southeast)
 Scott Township, Kosciusko County (south)
 German Township, Marshall County (southwest)
 Madison Township, St. Joseph County (northwest)

Major highways

References
 
 United States Census Bureau cartographic boundary files

External links

 Indiana Township Association
 United Township Association of Indiana

Townships in Elkhart County, Indiana
Townships in Indiana
1840s establishments in Indiana
Populated places established in the 1840s